Bekirhan is a town (belde) in the Kozluk District of Batman Province in Turkey. The town is populated by Kurds of the Bekiran tribe and had a population of 2,380 in 2021.

References 

Populated places in Batman Province
Kurdish settlements in Batman Province
Kozluk District